"Thanks Again" is a song written by Jim Rushing and recorded by American country music artist Ricky Skaggs.  It was released in June 1988 as the third single from the album Comin' Home to Stay.  The song reached #17 on the Billboard Hot Country Singles & Tracks chart.

Chart performance

References

1988 singles
1987 songs
Ricky Skaggs songs
Songs written by Jim Rushing
Song recordings produced by Ricky Skaggs
Epic Records singles